Valentine Dyall (7 May 1908 – 24 June 1985) was an English character actor. He worked regularly as a voice actor, and was known for many years as "The Man in Black", the narrator of the BBC Radio horror series Appointment with Fear.

He was the son of the actor Franklin Dyall and the actress and author Mary Phyllis Joan Logan, who acted and wrote as Concordia Merrel.

1930s to 1950s 
In 1934, Dyall appeared with his father, actor Franklin Dyall, at the Manchester Hippodrome in Sir Oswald Stoll's presentation of Shakespeare's Henry V, playing the roles of the Archbishop of Canterbury, Captain Gower, and a cardinal of France. He also appeared in one movie with his father, the 1943 spy thriller Yellow Canary; Dyall's part was that of a German U-boat commander attempting to kidnap a British agent from a ship in the Atlantic, while his father played the ship's captain. 

In the same year he had a small role as a German officer in The Life and Death of Colonel Blimp and, the following year, played the Duke of Burgundy in Laurence Olivier's film version of Henry V.

In 1946, he appeared, uncredited, as the character Stephen Lynn in the romantic film drama Brief Encounter; Lynn is protagonist Alec Harvey's friend whose unexpected arrival spoils Alec's opportunity of consummating his romance.

Dyall's film career peaked in the late 1940s; in 1949 he appeared in 12 films in that single year. However, those film roles varied greatly in size: two of them were leading roles (in Doctor Morelle and Vengeance Is Mine) whilst several others were just bit parts.

During the 1950s, Dyall made several guest appearances in episodes of the BBC Home Service radio comedy series The Goon Show, parodying his familiar radio persona.

In 1960, he played the witch Jethrow Keane in The City of the Dead (known as Horror Hotel in the United States).

1960s 
Dyall appeared in Robert Wise's 1963 film The Haunting as Mr. Dudley, the sinister caretaker of the haunted Hill House. Also that year, he played the central character Lord Fortnum in Spike Milligan and John Antrobus's stage play The Bedsitting Room, set in the aftermath of nuclear war. The play opened at the Mermaid Theatre on 31 January. Dyall narrated the mondo documentary The Mystery and the Pleasure in 1966, and part-narrated the pseudo-documentary The Naked World of Harrison Marks in 1967. In the same year he voiced the character of evil mastermind Dr. Noah in the James Bond parody movie Casino Royale, and also provided the voice of the mummy narrator in Secrets of Sex (1969).

With Dusty Springfield, Dyall co-hosted the BBC music variety series Decidedly Dusty in 1969; no complete episode has survived.

1970s and 1980s 
In 1975, at London's Royal Court Theatre, Dyall played Dr. Rance in a major revival of Joe Orton's play What the Butler Saw. Between 1977 and 1979, he appeared as Dr. Pascal Keldermans in the BBC television series Secret Army. He was in the cast of the BBC's Doctor Who to portray the Black Guardian in several serials (The Armageddon Factor from 1979 and the Mawdryn UndeadTerminusEnlightenment trilogy in 1983). At around the same time as The Armageddon Factor, he featured in the radio version of The Hitchhiker's Guide to the Galaxy, playing Gargravarr. In the TV and LP versions, he voiced the computer Deep Thought. He also played the character Norl in the Blake's 7 episode "City at the Edge of the World" and Lord Angus in the 1983 Black Adder episode "Witchsmeller Pursuivant". Also in 1983, he joined many other Doctor Who cast and crew members at Longleat for the show's 20th anniversary celebrations.

In 1984, Dyall appeared in the BBC Miss Marple episode "The Body in the Library". His last role on television was as Marcade in the BBC Television Shakespeare production of Love's Labour's Lost. His role as Captain Slarn in the Doctor Who radio serial Slipback was recorded on 10 June 1985, just 14 days before his death, and was broadcast posthumously.

Filmography

 The Missing Million (1942) as Supporting Role (film debut) (uncredited)
 The Day Will Dawn (1942) as German Guard at Cell Door Hatchway (uncredited)
 Much Too Shy (1942) as Defence Counsel (uncredited)
 The Silver Fleet (1943) as Markgraf
 The Life and Death of Colonel Blimp (1943) as Von Schönborn
 Yellow Canary (1943) as German Commander
 Hotel Reserve (1944) as Warren Skelton
 Henry V (1944) as Duke of Burgundy
 Latin Quarter (1945) as Prefecture of Police
 Brief Encounter (1945) as Stephen Lynn as Alec's 'Friend' (uncredited)
 I Know Where I'm Going! (1945) as Mr. Robinson
 Pink String and Sealing Wax (1945) as Police Inspector
 Caesar and Cleopatra (1945) as 1st. Guardsman
 Night Boat to Dublin (1946) as Sir George Bell
 Cyprus Is an Island (1946) as Narrator (voice)
 The White Unicorn (1947) as Storton
 Corridor of Mirrors (1948) as Counsel for Defence (uncredited)
 Night Comes Too Soon (1948) as Dr. George Clinton
 My Brother's Keeper (1948) as Inspector at Milton Wells
 Woman Hater (1948) as Spencer
 The Story of Shirley Yorke (1948) as Edward Holt
 The Case of Charles Peace (1949) as Storyteller
 The Glass Mountain (1949) as Opera Narrator (uncredited)
 The Queen of Spades (1949) as St. Germain's messenger
 For Them That Trespass (1949) as Toastmaster at Drew Party
 Man on the Run (1949) as Army Judge Advocate
 Christopher Columbus (1949) as Narrator (voice)
 Doctor Morelle (1949) as Dr. Morelle
 Vengeance Is Mine (1949) as Charles Heywood
 Helter Skelter (1949) as Man Telling Story at BBC (uncredited)
 Diamond City (1949) as Opening Narration (uncredited)
 Miss Pilgrim's Progress (1949) as Superintendent
 Man in Black (1949) as The Man in Black – Story-Teller
 Golden Salamander (1950) as Ben Ahrim (uncredited)
 The Body Said No! (1950) as John Sutherland
 Room to Let (1950) as Dr. Fell
 Stranger at My Door (1950) as Paul Wheeler
 Salute the Toff (1952) as Inspector Grice
 Hammer the Toff (1952) as Inspector Grice
 Ivanhoe (1952) as Norman Guard
 Paul Temple Returns (1952) as Superintendent Bradley
 Strange Stories (1953) as Storyteller / Narrator
 The Final Test (1953) as Man in Black (uncredited)
 Knights of the Round Table (1953) as Narrator (uncredited)
 Johnny on the Spot (1954) as Tyneley
 The Devil's Jest (1954) as Intelligence Director
 Suspended Alibi (1957) as Inspector Kayes
 Night Train for Inverness (1960) as Inspector Kent (uncredited)
 Identity Unknown (1960) as Ambrose
 The City of the Dead aka Horror Hotel (1960) as Jethrow Keane
 Fury at Smugglers' Bay (1961) as Narrator (uncredited)
 Fate Takes a Hand (1961) as Wilson
 The Haunting (1963) as Mr. Dudley
 The Horror of It All (1964) as Reginald Marley
 Son of Oblomov (1964) as Tarantyev
 One Man Band (1965) as Sir Lance Corporal
 The Wrong Box (1966) as Oliver Pike Harmsworth
 The Mystery and the Pleasure (1966) as Narrator (voice)
 The Night of the Generals (1967) as German Radio Announcer (voice, uncredited)
 Casino Royale (1967) as Vesper Lynd's Assistant / Dr. Noah's Voice (uncredited)
 The Naked World of Harrison Marks (1967) as Narrator (voice)
 Bedazzled (1967) as God (voice, uncredited)
 Oedipus the King (1968) as Chorus Leader (voice)
 Secrets of Sex (1970) as The Mummy (voice)
 Lust for a Vampire (1971) as Count Karnstein (voice, uncredited)
 The Great McGonagall (1975) as Narrator of the Werewolf Break (voice, uncredited)
 The Slipper and the Rose (1976) as 2nd Major Domo
 Come Play with Me (1977) as Minister of Finance
 Arabian Adventure (1979) as Jinnee (voice)
 Peter and Paul (1981, TV Movie) as Seneca
 Britannia Hospital (1982) as Mr. Rochester (final film)

Television

 The Avengers (1968) as Butler
 Secret Army (1977-1979) as Dr. Pascal Keldermans
 Doctor Who (1979-1983) as Black Guardian
 Blake's 7 (1980) as Norl
 All's Well That Ends Well (1981) as The Astringer
 The Hitchhiker's Guide to the Galaxy (1981) as Deep Thought
 Blackadder (1983) as Lord Angus
 Martin Luther, Heretic (1983) as Chancellor
 The Body in the Library (1984) as Lorrimer
 Love's Labour's Lost (1985) as Marcade

Bibliography
 1954: Unsolved Mysteries
 1955: Famous Sea Tragedies
 1957: Flood of Mutiny

References

External links 

1908 births
1985 deaths
English male television actors
Male actors from London
20th-century English male actors